The 42nd César Awards ceremony, presented by the Académie des Arts et Techniques du Cinéma, was held on 24 February 2017, at the Salle Pleyel in Paris to honour the best French films of 2016. Jérôme Commandeur hosted the César Awards ceremony for the first time.

The nominations were announced on 25 January 2017 by Academy president Alain Terzian and awards ceremony host Jérôme Commandeur.

Divines and It's Only the End of the World won three awards each.  Other films with multiple awards include Chocolat, My Life as a Courgette and Elle with two, with the latter film winning the Best Film honour.

Winners and nominees

Multiple nominations and awards
The following films received multiple nominations:

The following films received multiple awards:

Viewers
The show was followed by 1.9 million viewers. This corresponds to 10.5% of the audience.

See also
 22nd Lumières Awards
 7th Magritte Awards
 29th European Film Awards
 89th Academy Awards
 70th British Academy Film Awards

References

External links

 Official website

2017
2017 in French cinema
2017 film awards
February 2017 events in France